Castellaniella is a genus of gram-negative, facultatively anaerobic, motile bacteria from the family of Alcaligenaceae.

References

Burkholderiales
Bacteria genera